Glaphyristis is a genus of moth in the family Cosmopterigidae.

Species
 Glaphyristis lithinopa Meyrick, 1917
 Glaphyristis marmarea Meyrick, 1897
 Glaphyristis politicopa Meyrick, 1934

References

 Natural History Museum Lepidoptera genus database

Cosmopteriginae